Wilhelm "Willy" Fischer (March 26, 1904 – October 21, 1951) was a German politician from the Social Democratic Party (SPD) and a member of the German Bundestag.

Life 
In 1946, Fischer was a member of the Constituent State Assembly in Bavaria, and from 1946 until his entry into the German Bundestag he was a member of the Bavarian Landtag. In the first Bundestag elections of 1949, he was elected to parliament from the constituency of Nuremberg-Fürth and represented it until his death in 1951.

Literature

References

1904 births
1951 deaths
Members of the Bundestag for Bavaria
Members of the Bundestag 1949–1953
Members of the Bundestag for the Social Democratic Party of Germany
Members of the Landtag of Bavaria